ITU School of Aeronautics and Astronautics, founded in 1983, is the 11th school of Istanbul Technical University. Three departments were engaged to the faculty, which are Aeronautical Engineering, Astronautical engineering, and Meteorological Engineering. Aeronautical Engineering Department was established as a branch training aeronautical engineers in the Mechanical Engineering Faculty in 1941, and then in 1944 became a department of the Mechanical Engineering Faculty. Meteorological Engineering Department was established in 1953 in the School of Electrical and Electronic Engineering. It is the only Meteorological Engineering department in Turkey.

See also 
 ITUpSAT1, first Turkish cubesat

References

External links 
 ITU School of Aeronautics and Astronautics, official website
 Aeronautical Engineering
 Meteorological Engineering
 Astronautical Engineering
 Faculty on press
 Faculty bulletin
 ITU School of Aeronautics and Astronautics, official website (Tr)

Istanbul Technical University